Megan Jo McDonald is an American children's literature author. Her most popular works is the series of books which concern a third grade girl named Judy Moody (written for grades 2–4).  McDonald has also written many picture books for younger children and continues to write. Her most recent work was the Julie Albright series of books for American Girl.

Life and career
McDonald was born in Pittsburgh, Pennsylvania, to John and Mary Louise McDonald. She is the youngest of five girls, which served as the inspiration for The Sister's Club. She was awarded a B.A. from Oberlin College in 1981, and an M.L.S. from University of Pittsburgh in 1985.

Megan McDonald began her career as a children's librarian, working at Carnegie Library of Pittsburgh, Minneapolis Public Library, and Adams Memorial Library in Latrobe, Pennsylvania. Her first book, Is This a House for Hermit Crab?, came as a result of patrons asking her where to find a story she had told to children at a library.

McDonald is married to Richard Haynes and lives in Sebastopol, California.

Published works

Judy Moody and Stink
The Judy Moody series follows the humorous adventures of the title-character, an eight-year-old girl. A spin-off series follows her younger brother, nicknamed Stink. All of McDonald's books in the Judy Moody series and the Stink series are illustrated by Peter H. Reynolds.
 
Character list:
 Judy Moody
 Stink Moody 
 Rocky Zang 
 Frank Pearl 
 Jessica Finch
 Amy Namey
 Noc
 Alisson Monday
 Mr. Todd
 Jalisco 
 Tody 
 Chloe 
 Tori

Judy Moody books:
Judy Moody (Candlewick Press, 2000)
Judy Moody Gets Famous! (Candlewick Press, 2001)
Judy Moody Saves the World! (Candlewick Press, 2002)
Judy Moody Predicts the Future (Candlewick Press, 2003)
Judy Moody, M.D. The Doctor Is In (Published in the UK as Doctor Judy Moody) (Candlewick Press, 2004)
Judy Moody Declares Independence (Candlewick Press, 2005)
Judy Moody: Around the World in 8½ Days (Candlewick Press, 2006)
Judy Moody Goes to College (Candlewick Press, 2008)
Judy Moody: Girl Detective (Candlewick Press, 2010)
Judy Moody and the Not Bummer Summer (Candlewick Press, 2011)
Judy Moody and the Bad Luck Charm (Candlewick Press, 2012)
Judy Moody: Mood Martian (Candlewick Press, 2014)
Judy Moody and the Bucket List (Candlewick Press, 2016)
Judy Moody and the Royal Tea Party (Candlewick Press, 2017)
Judy Moody Book Quiz Whiz (Candlewick Press, 2018)

Judy Moody and Stink books:
Judy Moody & Stink: The Holly Joliday (Candlewick Press, 2008)
Judy Moody & Stink: The Mad, Mad, Mad, Mad Treasure Hunt (Candlewick Press, 2009)
Judy Moody & Stink: The Big Bad Blackout (Candlewick Press, 2014)
Judy Moody & Stink: The Wishbone Wish (Candlewick Press, 2015)

Stink books:
"Stink: The Incredible Shrinking Kid" (Candlewick Press, 2005)
"Stink: and the Incredible Super-Galactic Jawbreaker" (Candlewick Press, 2006)
"Stink: and the World's Worst Super-Stinky Sneakers" (Candlewick Press, 2007)
"Stink: and the Great Guinea Pig Express" (Candlewick Press, 2008)
"Stink: Solar System Superhero" (Candlewick Press, 2009)
"Stink: and the Ultimate Thumb-Wrestling Smackdown" (Candlewick Press, 2011)
"Stink: and the Midnight Zombie Walk" (Candlewick Press, 2012)
"Stink: and the Freaky Frog Freakout" (Candlewick Press, 2013)
"Stink: and the Shark Sleepover" (Candlewick Press, 2014)
"Stink Moody in Master of Disaster" (Candlewick Press, 2015)

Film:
Judy Moody and the Not Bummer Summer (2011)

Novels
The Bridge to Nowhere (Orchard, 1993)
Shadows in the Glasshouse (Pleasant Company, 2000)
The Sisters Club (American Girl, 2003)
All the Stars in the Sky: The Santa Fe Trail Diary of Florrie Mack Ryder (Dear America series, Scholastic, 2003)

The Sisters Club Series
The Sisters Club (2008)
The Rule of Three (2010)
Cloudy with a Chance of Boys (2011)

American Girl titles
Meet Julie
Julie Tells Her Story
Happy New Year, Julie!
Julie and the Eagles
Julie's Journey
Changes for Julie
A Brighter Tomorrow: My Journey with Julie
Pen Pals (American Girl Magazine)
The Gnome Diaries

Films
Megan McDonald's book, Judy Moody and the Not Bummer Summer, was adapted to a movie with the same name released in 2011, directed by John Schultz, with Jordana Beatty in the role of Judy Moody. McDonald co-wrote the screenplay with Kathy Waugh.

Awards
1991: Children's Choice Book, International Reading Association/Children's Book Council (CBC), for Is This a House for Hermit Crab?
1991: Reading Rainbow book selection, Is This a House for Hermit Crab?
1993: Judy Blume Contemporary Fiction Award, Society of Children's Book Writers and Illustrators, for The Bridge to Nowhere
1993: Carolyn W. Field Award, Pennsylvania Library Association, for The Great Pumpkin Switch
2003: Garden State Children's Book Award for Younger Fiction, for Judy Moody
2014 California Book Awards Juvenile Finalist for "Shoe Dog"

References

External links

 
 Judy Moody character at publisher Candlewick Press
 McDonald at American Girl Publishing
 "Judy Moody and the Not Bummer Summer" at IMDb
 

American children's writers
Oberlin College alumni
University of Pittsburgh alumni
People from Sebastopol, California
Writers from Pittsburgh
Writers from California
Living people
Year of birth missing (living people)